Statistics of Belgian First Division in the 1959–60 season.

Overview

It was contested by 16 teams, and Lierse S.K. won the championship.

League standings

Results

Belgian Pro League seasons
Belgian
1959–60 in Belgian football